Mara Fullin (born 13 January 1965 in Venice) is a former Italian women's professional basketball player. She was inducted into the Italian Basketball Hall of Fame, in 2014.

Club career
Fullin played throughout her career for AS Vicenza and Pool Comense, winning seven EuroLeague Women titles. She retired in 1998.

Italian national team
Fullin was a member of the senior Italian women's national team for thirteen years, taking part in the 1992 Summer Olympics, and the 1996 Summer Olympics. She also played at the 1990 FIBA World Championship for Women, and at five EuroBasket Women tournaments.

References

Italian women's basketball players
1965 births
Living people
Olympic basketball players of Italy
Basketball players at the 1992 Summer Olympics
Basketball players at the 1996 Summer Olympics
20th-century Italian women